Annick Le Loch (born 4 November 1954) was a member of the National Assembly of France.  She represented Finistère's 7th constituency from 2007 to 2017, as a member of the Socialiste, radical, citoyen et divers gauche.

References

1954 births
Living people
People from Pont-l'Abbé
Socialist Party (France) politicians
Women members of the National Assembly (France)
Deputies of the 13th National Assembly of the French Fifth Republic
Deputies of the 14th National Assembly of the French Fifth Republic
21st-century French women politicians